The 2019–20 season was Arbroath's first season back in the Scottish Championship, following promotion from Scottish League One in the 2018–19 season after finishing in 1st place. Arbroath also competed in the Challenge Cup, League Cup and the Scottish Cup. The season was postponed in April 2020, with Arbroath finishing in fifth place, having played 26 games.

Results

Scottish Champtonship

Matches

Scottish League Cup

Results

Scottish Challenge Cup

Scottish Cup

League table

League Cup table

Transfers

Transfers in

Transfers out

Loans in

References

Arbroath
Arbroath F.C. seasons
Arbroath F.C.